Qualification for the 2002 AFC U-17 Championship.

Group 1
All matches were played in Sanaa, Yemen.

Group 2

Group 3
All matches were played in Doha, Qatar.

Group 4
Both matches were played in Chennai, India.

Group 5
All matches were played in Tashkent, Uzbekistan.

Group 6
All matches were played in Dushanbe, Tajikistan.

Group 7
All matches were played in Yangon, Myanmar.

Group 8
All matches were played in Seoul, South Korea.

Group 9
All matches were played in Pyongyang, North Korea.

Group 10
All matches were played in Taipei, Taiwan.

Group 11
All matches were played in Kelana Jaya, Malaysia.

Teams qualified for AFC U-17 Championship 2002
 
 
 
 
 

 (host)

Qual
AFC U-16 Championship qualification